Rhizosthenes is a genus of moth in the family Lecithoceridae. It contains the species Rhizosthenes falciformis, which is found in China, Taiwan, Japan and Russia.

The wingspan is 22–27 mm.

References

Natural History Museum Lepidoptera genus database

Lecithocerinae
Monotypic moth genera